Rajurazbaram (also Romanized as Rajūrāzbaram) is a village in Malfejan Rural District, in the Central District of Siahkal County, Gilan Province, Iran. At the 2006 census, its population was 194, in 64 families.

References 

Populated places in Siahkal County